Nkoroo is a town in the Bonny territory of Rivers State, Nigeria. It is the home of the Nkoroo people and the Nkoroo language. 

Towns in Rivers State